This article presents the top-rated American primetime broadcast network television series by season from 1950 to the present according to Nielsen Media Research.

1950s

October 1950–April 1951

October 1951–April 1952

October 1952–April 1953

October 1953–April 1954

October 1954–April 1955

October 1955–April 1956

October 1956–April 1957

October 1957–April 1958

October 1958–April 1959

October 1959–April 1960

1960s

October 1960–April 1961

October 1961–April 1962

October 1962–April 1963

October 1963–April 1964

October 1964–April 1965

October 1965–April 1966

October 1966–April 1967

October 1967–April 1968

October 1968–April 1969

October 1969–April 1970

1970s

October 1970–April 1971

October 1971–April 1972

October 1972–April 1973

September 1973–April 1974

September 1974–April 1975

September 1975–April 1976

September 1976–April 1977

September 1977–April 1978

September 1978–April 1979

September 1979–April 1980

1980s

September 1980–April 1981

September 1981–April 1982

September 1982–April 1983

September 1983–April 1984

September 1984–April 1985

September 1985–April 1986

September 1986–April 1987

September 1987–April 1988

October 1988–April 1989

September 1989–April 1990

1990s

September 1990–April 1991

September 1991–April 1992

September 1992–April 1993

September 1993–April 1994

September 1994–April 1995

September 1995–May 1996

September 1996–May 1997

September 1997–May 1998

September 1998–May 1999

September 1999–May 2000

2000s

September 2000–May 2001

September 2001–May 2002

September 2002–May 2003

September 2003–May 2004

September 2004–May 2005

September 2005–May 2006

September 2006–May 2007

September 2007–May 2008

September 2008–May 2009

September 2009–May 2010

2010s

September 2010–May 2011

September 2011–May 2012

September 2012–May 2013

September 2013–May 2014

September 2014–May 2015

September 2015–May 2016

September 2016–May 2017

September 2017–May 2018

September 2018–May 2019

Multiple Rankings in the Top 30

43 seasons
60 Minutes (CBS)

32 seasons
Monday Night Football (ABC)

18 seasons
Gunsmoke (CBS)

17 seasons
Disneyland/Walt Disney's Wonderful World of Color/The Wonderful World of Disney (ABC/NBC)
The Red Skelton Show (NBC/CBS)
Survivor (CBS)
The Toast of the Town/The Ed Sullivan Show (CBS)

16 seasons
NCIS (CBS)

15 seasons
CSI: Crime Scene Investigation (CBS)
Grey's Anatomy (ABC)

14 seasons
American Idol (FOX/ABC)
Dancing with the Stars (ABC)
ER (NBC)

13 seasons
Criminal Minds (CBS)
Sunday Night Football (NBC)

12 seasons
All in the Family/Archie Bunker's Place (CBS)
Bonanza (NBC)
Law & Order (NBC)
The Lucy Show/Here's Lucy (CBS)
Two and a Half Men (CBS)

11 seasons
Frasier (NBC)
Law & Order: Special Victims Unit (NBC)
Murder, She Wrote (CBS)
My Three Sons (ABC/CBS)

10 seasons
The Big Bang Theory (CBS)
CSI: Miami (CBS)
Dallas (CBS)
Friends (NBC)
I've Got a Secret (CBS)
The Jack Benny Show (CBS)
M*A*S*H (CBS)
NCIS: Los Angeles (CBS)
NYPD Blue (ABC)
Roseanne/The Conners (ABC)

9 seasons
The King of Queens (CBS)
Blue Bloods (CBS)
The Carol Burnett Show (CBS)
Cheers (NBC)
Dragnet (NBC)
Happy Days (ABC)
Hawaii Five-O (CBS)
Lassie (CBS)
The Voice (NBC)
You Bet Your Life (NBC)

8 seasons
The Andy Griffith Show (CBS)
The Beverly Hillbillies (CBS)
The Cosby Show (NBC)
Desperate Housewives (ABC)
Everybody Loves Raymond (CBS)
General Electric Theater (CBS)
Home Improvement (ABC)
The Jeffersons (CBS)
Knots Landing (CBS)
Little House on the Prairie/Little House: A New Beginning (NBC)
One Day at a Time (CBS)
20/20 (ABC)
The Virginian/The Men from Shiloh (NBC)

7 seasons
Alice (CBS)
Arthur Godfrey's Talent Scouts (CBS)
Castle (ABC)
Cold Case (CBS)
CSI: NY (CBS)
The Danny Thomas Show (CBS)
The F.B.I. (ABC)
The Golden Girls (NBC)
The Good Wife (CBS)
The Jackie Gleason Show (1962-1970) (CBS)
Laverne & Shirley (ABC)
The Love Boat (ABC)
The Mentalist (CBS)
Murphy Brown (CBS)
Three's Company (ABC)
The Waltons (CBS)
What's My Line? (CBS)
Without a Trace (CBS)

6 seasons
The Bachelor (ABC)
Bewitched (ABC)
Coach (ABC)
Dateline NBC (NBC)
Dynasty (ABC)
Falcon Crest (CBS)
Fireside Theatre (NBC)
Full House (ABC)
Growing Pains (ABC)
Have Gun – Will Travel (CBS)
House (FOX)
The Life of Riley (NBC)
I Love Lucy (CBS)
Ironside (NBC)
Judging Amy (CBS)
L.A. Law (NBC)
Lost (ABC)
The Mary Tyler Moore Show (CBS)
Matlock (NBC/ABC)
Newhart (CBS)
Night Court (NBC)
The Perry Como Show (NBC)
Perry Mason (CBS)
Primetime Live (ABC)
Sanford and Son (NBC)
Seinfeld (NBC)
Trapper John, M.D. (CBS)
Wagon Train (NBC/ABC)
The West Wing (NBC)
Who's the Boss? (ABC)

5 seasons
Arthur Godfrey and His Friends (CBS)
Chicago Fire (NBC)
The Colgate Comedy Hour (NBC)
The Dean Martin Show (NBC)
A Different World (NBC)
The Dukes of Hazzard (CBS)
Fantasy Island (ABC)
The Ford Show (NBC)
Gomer Pyle, U.S.M.C. (CBS)
Head of the Class (ABC)
In the Heat of the Night (NBC)
JAG (CBS)
The Lawrence Welk Show (ABC)
Magnum, P.I. (CBS)
The Millionaire (CBS)
Modern Family (ABC)
NCIS: New Orleans (CBS)
Pabst Blue Ribbon Bouts (CBS)
Private Secretary (CBS)
Rawhide (CBS)
The Real McCoys (ABC)
Rowan & Martin's Laugh-In (NBC)
Texaco Star Theater/The Milton Berle Show/The Buick-Berle Show (NBC)
This Is Your Life (NBC)
Thursday Night Football (CBS/NBC/FOX)
Touched by an Angel (CBS)
Unsolved Mysteries (NBC)

4 seasons
The A-Team (NBC)
Adam-12 (NBC)
Alfred Hitchcock Presents (CBS)
Barnaby Jones (CBS)
Barney Miller (ABC)
Becker (CBS)
The Blacklist (NBC)
The Bob Newhart Show (CBS)
Brothers & Sisters (ABC)
Candid Camera (CBS)
Cannon (CBS)
Charlie's Angels (ABC)
Cheyenne (ABC)
Chicago Med (NBC)
Daniel Boone (NBC)
December Bride (CBS)
The Dick Van Dyke Show (CBS)
The Doris Day Show (CBS)
The Drew Carey Show (ABC)
Eight Is Enough (ABC)
Empty Nest (NBC)
Extreme Makeover: Home Edition (ABC)
The Facts of Life (NBC)
The Fall Guy (ABC)
Family Affair (CBS)
Family Ties (NBC)
Ford Theatre (NBC)
The George Burns and Gracie Allen Show (CBS)
Gillette Cavalcade of Sports (NBC)
Good Times (CBS)
Green Acres (CBS)
Hunter (NBC)
Kate & Allie (CBS)
Law & Order: Criminal Intent (NBC)
The Lawman (ABC)
The Life and Legend of Wyatt Earp (ABC)
Madam Secretary (CBS)
Mama (CBS)
Mannix (CBS)
Marcus Welby, M.D. (ABC)
Maude (CBS)
Medical Center (CBS)
The Mod Squad (ABC)
Mom (CBS)
Person of Interest (CBS)
Petticoat Junction (CBS)
Philco TV Playhouse (NBC)
The Price Is Right (NBC)
Real People (NBC)
The Rifleman (ABC)
Scandal (ABC)
Simon & Simon (CBS)
That's Incredible! (ABC)
24 (FOX)
Walker, Texas Ranger (CBS)
Will & Grace (NBC)
Wings (NBC)
The Wonder Years (ABC)
The X-Files (FOX)
Your Hit Parade (NBC)

3 seasons
ALF (NBC)
Amen (NBC)
America's Funniest Home Videos (ABC)
The Big Story (NBC)
Bones (FOX)
Bull (CBS)
Chicago Hope (CBS)
CHiPs (NBC)
Crossing Jordan (NBC)
Deal or No Deal (NBC)
Dennis the Menace (CBS)
Designing Women (CBS)
Dharma & Greg (ABC)
Diff'rent Strokes (NBC)
Dr. Kildare (NBC)
Elementary (CBS)
Empire (FOX)
Evening Shade (CBS)
Family Law (CBS)
Family Matters (ABC)
Father Knows Best (NBC/CBS)
Fear Factor (NBC)
The Flintstones (ABC)
The Flip Wilson Show (NBC)
The Fresh Prince of Bel-Air (NBC)
The Garry Moore Show (CBS)
Goodyear TV Playhouse (NBC)
Grace Under Fire (ABC)
Hart to Hart (ABC)
Hazel (NBC)
Highway to Heaven (NBC)
Hill Street Blues (NBC)
Hotel (ABC)
House Calls (CBS)
Just Shoot Me! (NBC)
Kojak (CBS)
Kraft Television Theatre (NBC)
The Jackie Gleason Show (1952-1957) (CBS)
The Lineup (CBS)
The Lone Ranger (ABC)
Mad About You (NBC)
Mayberry R.F.D. (CBS)
Moonlighting (ABC)
Northern Exposure (CBS)
The Partridge Family (ABC)
People Are Funny (NBC)
The Practice (ABC)
Providence (NBC)
Rhoda (CBS)
The Rookies (ABC)
Scarecrow & Mrs. King (CBS)
Scorpion (CBS)
77 Sunset Strip (ABC)
The Simpsons (FOX)
The Six Million Dollar Man (ABC)
60 Minutes II (CBS)
The $64,000 Question (CBS)
The Smothers Brothers Comedy Hour (CBS)
Soap (ABC)
Spin City (ABC)
The Streets of San Francisco (ABC)
This Is Us (NBC)
227 (NBC)
Valerie/Valerie's Family/The Hogan Family (NBC)
Welcome Back, Kotter (ABC)
Yes, Dear (CBS)
Your Show of Shows (NBC)
Zane Grey Theater (CBS)

2 seasons
The Adventures of Robin Hood (CBS)
The Alan Young Show (CBS)
All Star Revue (NBC)
The Amazing Race (CBS)
America's Funniest People (ABC)
Amos 'n' Andy (CBS)
The Ann Sothern Show (CBS)
The Apprentice (NBC)
Armstrong Circle Theatre (NBC)
The Bachelorette (ABC)
Baretta (ABC)
Ben Casey (ABC)
The Big Event (NBC)
Big Town (CBS)
The Bionic Woman (ABC)
Bob Hope Presents the Chrysler Theatre (NBC)
Body of Proof (ABC)
Cagney & Lacey (CBS)
Caroline in the City (NBC)
Chicago P.D. (NBC)
Chico and the Man (NBC)
Climax! (CBS)
Code Black (CBS)
Cosby (CBS)
Cybill (CBS)
Daktari (CBS)
Dave's World (CBS)
Dear John (NBC)
The Defenders (CBS)
Diagnosis: Murder (CBS)
Dr. Quinn, Medicine Woman (CBS)
The Donna Reed Show (ABC)
Doogie Howser, M.D. (ABC)
Ellen (ABC)
Flipper (NBC)
48 Hours (CBS)
The Fugitive (ABC)
Gangbusters (NBC)
The George Gobel Show (NBC)
Get Smart (NBC)
Gilligan's Island (CBS)
The Glen Campbell Goodtime Hour (CBS)
The Good Doctor (ABC)
Grand (NBC)
The Guardian (CBS)
Hee Haw (CBS)
Heroes (NBC)
Hogan's Heroes (CBS)
Hopalong Cassidy (NBC)
How to Get Away with Murder (ABC)
I Dream of Jeannie (NBC)
Jesse (NBC)
The Jim Nabors Hour (CBS)
Julia (NBC)
Kung Fu (ABC)
Little Big Shots (NBC)
The Loretta Young Show (NBC)
Lou Grant (CBS)
Love & War (CBS)
Lux Video Theatre (NBC)
Major Dad (CBS)
Man Against Crime (NBC)
The Many Loves of Dobie Gillis (CBS)
Martin Kane, Private Eye (NBC)
Maverick (ABC)
McHale's Navy (ABC)
Miami Vice (NBC)
Mike & Molly (CBS)
Mork & Mindy (ABC)
My Favorite Martian (CBS)
The Naked Truth (ABC/NBC)
Name That Tune (CBS)
The Nanny (CBS)
9-1-1 (FOX)
Our Miss Brooks (CBS)
The Patty Duke Show (ABC)
Peter Gunn (NBC)
The Phil Silvers Show (CBS)
Police Woman (NBC)
Private Practice (ABC)
The Red Buttons Show (CBS)
Rescue 911 (CBS)
Riptide (NBC)
Robert Montgomery Presents (NBC)
Route 66 (CBS)
The Roy Rogers Show (NBC)
Rules of Engagement (CBS)
Shark (CBS)
The Single Guy (NBC)
The Sonny & Cher Comedy Hour (CBS)
Still Standing (CBS)
Strike It Rich (CBS)
Sugarfoot (ABC)
Tales of Wells Fargo (NBC)
Taxi (ABC)
3rd Rock from the Sun (NBC)
To Tell the Truth (CBS)
Too Close for Comfort (ABC)
Treasury Men in Action (NBC)
TV's Bloopers & Practical Jokes (NBC)
2 Broke Girls (CBS)
Undercover Boss (CBS)
The Unit (CBS)
Vega$ (ABC)
Veronica's Closet (NBC)
Wanted: Dead or Alive (CBS)
Webster (ABC)
What's Happening!! (ABC)
Who Wants to Be a Millionaire (ABC)
Young Sheldon (CBS)

Lists of American television series